Mokhdan (also Romanized as Mokhdān) is a village in Howmeh Rural District, in the Central District of Deyr County, Bushehr Province, Iran. At the 2006 census, its population was 37, in 9 families.

References 

Populated places in Deyr County